The Mapúa Institute of Technology at Laguna (MITL) is the flagship college of the Mapúa Malayan Colleges Laguna. The college is under the Mapúa School of Engineering in the Philippines.

MITL is among the three pioneer colleges under MCL. It offers architecture and seven engineering programs.

Degree Programs
MITL offers the following degree programs:
Bachelor of Science in Architecture
Bachelor of Science in Chemical Engineering
Bachelor of Science in Civil Engineering
Bachelor of Science in Computer Engineering
Bachelor of Science in Electrical Engineering
Bachelor of Science in Electronics Engineering
Bachelor of Science in Industrial Engineering
Bachelor of Science in Mechanical Engineering

Cardinal Cup
In 9–11 November 2011, the MITL held its first MITL week which signified the start of a tradition that will challenge the seven engineering programs to compete for the Cardinal Cup.

References
Malayan Colleges Laguna

2007 establishments in the Philippines
Universities and colleges in Laguna (province)
Education in Cabuyao
Mapúa University